People nicknamed Dub or Dubs include:

 Dub Garrett (1925–1976), American football player
 Dub Jones (singer) (1928–2000), American bass R&B singer
 Dub Jones (American football) (born 1924), American former National Football League player
 Dub Robinson (c. 1920–1987), former tennis coach at Louisiana State University
 Dub Taylor (1907–1994), American actor
 Jamie Wilkinson, internet culture researcher and software engineer nicknamed "Dubs"
 Dub Williams (1927–2014), American politician

See also 

Dub (disambiguation)

Lists of people by nickname